RoseMarie Panio (born 1941) is an American politician that ran the Westchester County, New York Republican Committee from 2004 to 2007. She was unanimously elected Secretary for the State GOP in 2006, but has been unsuccessful in three attempts at public office, including a 2007 race for Town supervisor of her home town. Panio owns a liquor store in Peekskill, New York, and is a grandmother. She resides in Yorktown Heights, New York.

Political career and background
Panio was the first female Chairperson of the Westchester County Republican Committee. Panio's leadership was the subject of criticism as Westchester, one of the oldest Republican strongholds in the United States and home of former Governor George Pataki, began to trend heavily Democratic during her tenure. After her resignation, it was announced that the Westchester Republican Committee's bank account held a negative balance.

Prior to her election, she served as Vice-Chairperson for nine years. She also held the position of Chairperson of the Republican Committee for the Town of Yorktown for fourteen years. Before entering politics and owning a liquor store, Panio had worked in the advertising office of Look Magazine.

In 1997 she ran as a candidate for the Westchester County Board of Legislators, losing a close election to Democrat Michael Kaplowitz by only 39 votes. She lost a rematch in 1999 in another close election. She was elected as a delegate to the Republican National Convention in 1996 was an alternate delegate to the 2004 Republican National Convention in New York City.

Panio was appointed to the NYS Watershed Protection and Partnership Council by Governor George Pataki, served on the White House Committee on Small Business, and also as Chairperson for the 19th Congressional District's Senior Task Force. She is a member of the Yorktown Conservation Board and sits on the board of directors for Hudson Valley Hospital Center. Panio has received the Josh Hand Award in 1998, the Croton Watershed Clean Water Coalition Award in 2001, and was named one of New York State's Woman in Distinction in 2004 by the New York State Senate.

Panio is involved in many local civic activities, and is the Vice-President of the Peekskill, NY Chamber of Commerce, a member of the Yorktown Recycling Committee, Town Cleanup Committee, and Heart Fund Committee, President of the Lincoln Society, a member of the Ladies Auxiliary of the Christopher Columbus Society, the Circolo da Vinci organization, and founder of the Friends of the Croton Watershed. She is also fluent in Italian.

On June 11, 2007 Panio announced her resignation as Chairperson of the Westchester County Republican Committee in order to run for the position of Town Supervisor in Yorktown, New York. She was quickly endorsed by the Town Committee which she chairs.
She was vying to replace Republican Linda Cooper, who opted not to seek reelection after twelve years in office. Panio's opponent was Yorktown Resident and business owner Don Peters, a former Republican who switched his party affiliation to Democrat in order to run for Town Supervisor in 2005, whom Cooper defeated by a comfortable yet slim margin. Independent Linda Clemenza, who was also an unsuccessful candidate for Supervisor in 2005, announced she would mount another write-in campaign in 2007. For the general election Panio was endorsed by the Journal News, but was still defeated easily by Peters, as he and other Democrats swept many traditionally Republican northern Westchester races.

Electoral history

Panio also ran on the Conservative Party of New York ticket.

See also 
Westchester County, NY

Notes

External links
 
Official Website of Friends of RoseMarie Panio
New York State Republican Committee
Westchester County GOP

1941 births
Living people
Politicians from Westchester County, New York
American people of Italian descent
New York (state) Republicans
People from Yorktown Heights, New York
American drink industry businesspeople
American businesspeople in retailing
Women in New York (state) politics
20th-century American businesspeople
20th-century American businesswomen
20th-century American politicians
20th-century American women politicians
21st-century American businesspeople
21st-century American businesswomen
21st-century American politicians
21st-century American women politicians